"It's a Miracle" is a 1975 single by Barry Manilow and was the second release from his album, Barry Manilow II.  "It's a Miracle" went to number twelve on the U.S. Billboard Hot 100 and was Manilow's second number one on the U.S. Easy Listening chart, spending one week at number one in April 1975.  The single also peaked at number fifteen on the disco/dance chart, and was the first of four entries on the chart.  "It's a Miracle" was followed by "Could It Be Magic".

In Canada, "It's a Miracle" was a number one hit, spending two weeks at the top spot.  It was his second and final number one song in that nation, and is ranked as the 25th biggest Canadian hit of 1975. 

The song describes the rigors of a long concert tour across America.  The "miracle" is coming home and rediscovering love and intimacy after having gone for a protracted time without it.  Once the singer returns home, he is determined to never leave again.

Cash Box said that it's "an up-tempo, rocking tune with a great dance rhythm." Record World called it "an all-purpose disco-dynamic delight."

"It's a Miracle" is traditionally the first song played at Barry Manilow concerts. The album version of the song features riffs from a saxophone at the instrumental outro.

Chart performance

Weekly charts

Year-end charts

See also
List of number-one adult contemporary singles of 1975 (U.S.)

References

External links
  (Single edit, hit version)
  (Studio LP version)

1975 singles
Barry Manilow songs
Songs written by Barry Manilow
RPM Top Singles number-one singles
Song recordings produced by Ron Dante
Songs with lyrics by Marty Panzer
1974 songs
Arista Records singles